Willner may refer to:

Surnames
Alfred M. Willner (1859–1929), Austrian composer and librettist
Arthur Willner (1881–1959), Czech composer
Hal Willner (1956–2020), American film and television music producer
Lisa Willner, American politician
Mats Willner (b. 1968), Swedish journalist
Robert Willner (b. unknown, d. 1995), American physician from Florida who denied AIDS is caused by HIV

Places
 Rural Municipality of Willner No. 253, Saskatchewan, Canada

German-language surnames
Surnames of German origin
Surnames of Czech origin
Surnames of Swedish origin